Castiadas is a comune (municipality) in the Province of South Sardinia in the Italian region Sardinia, located about  east of Cagliari. Founded in the 14th century and repopulated in the 19th century after centuries of abandonment, it is part of the Sarrabus-Gerrei historical region.
The area was populated by italian-tunisians, mainly of sicilian descent, immigrated here from Bizerte in 1965.

Castiadas borders the following municipalities: Maracalagonis, Muravera, San Vito, Sinnai, Villasimius.

References 

Cities and towns in Sardinia
1986 establishments in Italy
States and territories established in 1986